The 2006 Russian military Mil Mi-8 crash near Vladikavkaz  killed 12 Russian military men, mostly high-ranking officers, among them Lieutenant-General Pavel Yaroslavtsev, deputy chief for army logistics, Lieutenant-General Viktor Guliaev, deputy chief of army medical units, and Major-General Vladimir Sorokin.

The Ossetian rebel group Kataib al-Khoul claimed responsibility for shooting down the helicopter.

References

External links
3 Russian generals reported dead in crash GlobalSecurity.Org

21st-century mass murder in Russia
Terrorist incidents in Russia in 2006
Aviation accidents and incidents in 2006
Aviation accidents and incidents in Russia
Caucasian Front (militant group)
September 2006 events in Russia
Accidents and incidents involving the Mil Mi-8